In mathematics, especially in differential topology, Thom's second isotopy lemma is a family version of Thom's first isotopy lemma; i.e., it states a family of maps between Whitney stratified spaces is locally trivial when it is a Thom mapping. Like the first isotopy lemma, the lemma was introduced by René Thom.

 gives a sketch of the proof.  gives a simplified proof. Like the first isotopy lemma, the lemma also holds for the stratification with Bekka's condition (C), which is weaker than Whitney's condition (B).

Thom mapping

Let  be a smooth map between smooth manifolds and  submanifolds such that  both have differential of constant rank. Then Thom's condition  is said to hold if for each sequence  in X converging to a point y in Y and such that  converging to a plane  in the Grassmannian, we have 

Then  is called a Thom mapping if the following conditions hold:
 are proper.

Then Thom's second isotopy lemma says that a Thom mapping is locally trivial over Z; i.e., each point z of Z has a neighborhood U with homeomorphisms  over U such that .

See also

References

Differential topology
Lemmas
Stratifications